Henry Stowers (born 3 March 1995) is a New Zealand born, Samoan rugby union player who plays for the Benetton Rugby in the United Rugby Championship. His playing position is flanker. 
He is also a Samoan international.

Biography
Stowers was born in Lower Hutt, New Zealand, with family from Tafagamanu and Salea’aumua in Samoa. He was educated at Wainuiomata High School, before moving to Scots College, Wellington. He is a nephew of Samoan international George Stowers.

Career

Club
Stowers played rugby in high school. In 2012 he was selected for the Hurricanes under-18 team. He also played with the Wellington Under-19s, with whom he won the Provincial Under-19 Championship in 2014. He then played with local club Wainuiomata. 

Stowers launched his professional career in 2014, playing with Wellington in the National Provincial Championship. After playing 5 games with Wellington, he moved to Bay of Plenty for the 2016 and 2017 seasons.  At the beginning of 2016, he had the opportunity to train with the Chiefs franchise , and took part in a tour in Hong Kong with the franchise's Development team.

In 2018, he decided to join the Australian Western Force franchise  which had just been excluded from Super Rugby , in order to compete in World Series Rugby. He also competed in the National Rugby Championship (NRC), and won this competition in 2019. The same year, his team also won Global Rapid Rugby, having finished the season undefeated. After two years at the Western Force, his side returned to Super Rugby, and Stowers made his Super Rugby AU debut on July 11, 2020 against the Waratahs. He played seven games during the competition, all of them as a starter. Despite his substantial playing time, he was not retained at the end of the season, and left the franchise. 

Without a professional contract, he then joined the NHRU Wildfires , newly integrated into the Shute Shield for the 2021 season. After several good performances with his new club, he was recruited during the season by the Brumbies franchise , just before the final stages of Super Rugby AU. He played his first match in the final lost by his team against the Queensland Reds. He then continued with Super Rugby Unlocked, and played five matches.

In 2022, for the 2022 Super Rugby Pacific season, he joined the new Moana Pasifika franchise , which had just entered Super Rugby. He immediately established himself as the team's starting third center line.

International
Stowers was selected with the Samoa under-20 team in 2014, and played in the World Junior Championship. He captained the team, and played in all four of his team's games, including the win over Scotland.

The following year he planned to represent New Zealand at the Junior Championship of Oceania, but an injury prevented him from doing so. Despite this, he was still selected to participate in the 2015 World Juniors in Italy. He played in his team's three pool matches, then in the semi-final won against France. However, he did not play in the final that his team won against England.

In 2018, he played in the World Rugby Pacific Challenge with the Samoa A team, of which he was immediately named captain.

In June 2019, he was selected for the first time with the Samoa team in order to participate in the Pacific Nations Cup 2019 and prepare for the World Cup in Japan. He played his first game for Samoa on 3 August 2019 against the United States. He played two games during the PNC, but ultimately was not selected for the RWC team. In 2021, he was recalled to the Samoan selection for the double confrontation against Tonga , qualifying for the next World Cup. The Samoans finally manage to qualify, having won by a wide margin in both matches.

Reference list

External links
 

1995 births
Samoan rugby union players
Samoa international rugby union players
Living people
Rugby union flankers
Moana Pasifika players
Wellington rugby union players
Bay of Plenty rugby union players
Western Force players
ACT Brumbies players
Canterbury rugby union players
Benetton Rugby players
Rugby union number eights